Rochester Adams High School (also known as Adams High School, Adams, or AHS) is a public high school located in Rochester Hills, Michigan, and is part of the Rochester Community Schools district.

Academics

Rochester Adams High School has been accredited by the Cognia or its predecessors since 1971.

Demographics
The demographic breakdown of the 1,586 students enrolled for 2018-19 was:
Boys - 51.6%
Girls - 48.4%
Native American/Alaskan - 0.4%
Asian - 15.1%
Black - 4.0%
Hispanic - 4.1%
Native Hawaiian/Pacific islanders - 0.1%
White - 72.4%
Multiracial - 3.9%
4.4% of the students were eligible for free or reduced-cost lunch.

Athletics
Adams has various boys and girls sports in the fall, winter, and spring seasons.

Notable alumni

Entertainers and musicians
 Tommy Clufetos (born 1979), drummer for Black Sabbath, Ozzy Osbourne, Rob Zombie, Alice Cooper and Ted Nugent
 Joe Henry (born 1960), singer/songwriter/record producer
 Robert Hurst (born 1964), jazz musician
 Jamison Jones, actor
 Jana Kramer (born 1983), actress/singer
 Madonna (born 1958), entertainer/singer/actress/producer
 Karen Moncrieff (born 1963), actress/director
 Christopher Yost (born 1973, class of 1991), screenwriter

Athletes
 Michelle Berube (born 1966), USA Olympian at the 1984 and 1988 Olympics.
 Amy Frazier (born 1972), professional female tennis player
 Shawn Hare (born 1967), former professional baseball player 
 J. P. Reese (born 1980), professional MMA fighter
 Mary Jo Sanders (born 1974, class of 1992), professional female boxer
 Jacob Trouba (born 1994), defenseman and captain for the New York Rangers
 Alex Vanderkaay (born 1986), NCAA swimming champion in the 400-yard individual medley
 Peter Vanderkaay (born 1984), Olympic Gold Medalist swimmer

Other
Mike Bishop (born 1967), former U.S. Representative from Michigan's 8th congressional district
George D. Zamka (born 1962, class of 1980), NASA astronaut
David Shaw (American football) (Born 1972), Former american football coach for the Stanford Cardinal football team

References

External links

Public high schools in Michigan
Educational institutions established in 1970
High schools in Oakland County, Michigan
1970 establishments in Michigan
Schools in Rochester Hills, Michigan